Brawl or Brawling may refer to:
 Brawl, a large-scale fist fight usually involving multiple participants
Brawl Stars, a game desarrollated by Supercell, created at 2018
Brawl, Scotland, a crofting community on the north coast of Scotland
Brawling (legal definition), a rowdy argument on church property
Bench-clearing brawl, a large-scale fight occurring during a game or match
 Brawl (band), an American hard rock band that was later renamed Disturbed
Brawl (game), a real-time card game
Brawl (Transformers), a Transformers character
Super Smash Bros. Brawl, a 2008 platform fighting game for the Nintendo Wii
Branle, a French dance style, pronounced "Brawl"

See also
Brawler (disambiguation)